Clarence "Jazz" Jackson (born March 5, 1952) is a former American football running back who played in the National Football League for the New York Jets for three seasons from 1974 to 1976 for a total of 33 career games.

References

Living people
1952 births
New York Jets players
American football running backs
Western Kentucky Hilltoppers football players